Misterioso (Recorded on Tour) is a live album by Thelonious Monk, released for Columbia Records. It was recorded at various locations on tour.

Track listing
All tracks composed by Thelonious Monk; except where indicated

Side A
"Well, You Needn't" – 7:50
"Misterioso" – 9:40
"Light Blue" – 5:38
"I'm Gettin' Sentimental Over You" (Ned Washington, George Bassman) – 5:44

Side B
"All the Things You Are" (Oscar Hammerstein II, Jerome Kern) – 6:46
"Honeysuckle Rose" (Andy Razaf, Fats Waller) – 4:40
"Bemsha Swing" (Thelonious Monk, Denzil Best) – 4:10
"Evidence" – 7:50

Personnel
Thelonious Monk – piano
Charlie Rouse – tenor saxophone
Butch Warren – bass on "Misterioso", "Light Blue" and "Evidence"
Frank Dunlop – drums on "Misterioso", "Light Blue" and "Evidence"
Larry Gales – bass on "Well, You Needn't", "I'm Gettin' Sentimental Over You", "All the Things You Are", "Honeysuckle Rose" and "Bemsha Swing"
Ben Riley – drums on "Well, You Needn't", "I'm Gettin' Sentimental Over You", "All the Things You Are", "Honeysuckle Rose" and "Bemsha Swing"

References

Thelonious Monk live albums
1965 live albums
albums produced by Teo Macero
Columbia Records live albums